George Francis Musso (April 8, 1910 – September 5, 2000) was an American professional football player who spent his entire 12-year career as a guard and offensive tackle for the Chicago Bears of the National Football League (NFL). He was inducted into the Pro Football Hall of Fame in 1982.

Early life
Musso was the son of a coal miner who starred in high school sports in Collinsville, Illinois, and was therefore offered an athletic grant to attend James Millikin University. His father, who initially planned to pull him out of school after he completed his "primary" education, grudgingly allowed George to attend college.

College years
Musso attended Millikin University and was a standout in football, basketball, baseball, and track. Millikin was in the "Little 19" conference that included such teams as Eureka, Lombard, and Augustana. In 1929, Musso played against future President Ronald Reagan, who played guard for Eureka College and weighed about 175 pounds; Eureka lost to Musso and Millikin 45–6. Musso was already larger than most linemen of his era, playing college ball at 6' 2", 255 pounds. In 1933, Musso played in the East-West All-Star game, held in Chicago; it was there he first got the attention of George Halas.

NFL years
Halas, who had doubts the small school Musso could make it in the NFL, offered Musso a $90 a game contract (this was half rate for regular players at that time). Musso agreed and, although he struggled at first, became the centerpiece of the Bears line for 12 years. One reason the Bears of that era were called "Monsters of the Midway" was their imposing size—Musso, who played professionally at 270 pounds, was one of the largest Bears and one of the largest players in the league. His teammates called him "Moose." He played offensive tackle until 1937 when he moved to guard. He was the first to win All-NFL at two positions; tackle (1935), and guard (1937). He played middle guard or nose tackle on defense his entire career. Musso captained the Chicago Bears for nine seasons, playing on the line with other NFL notables as Link Lyman, Joe Kopcha, Walt Kiesling, Bulldog Turner, Joe Stydahar, and Danny Fortmann. He played in seven NFL championship games, with the Bears winning four (1933, 1940, 1941, and 1943).  He was inducted to the Pro Football Hall of Fame in 1982. Of note, in 1935 as an NFL lineman, Musso played against Gerald Ford of Michigan in the 1935 College All-Star game. Without a doubt, Musso is the only NFL player, to have played against two U.S. Presidents.

After the NFL
Musso retired to Edwardsville, Illinois, and began a restaurant business. He served as the Madison County, Illinois, sheriff and treasurer from the 1950s through the 1970s. He died in his home in Edwardsville in 2000.

References

External links
Pro Football Hall of Fame: Member profile

1910 births
2000 deaths
American football offensive tackles
American football offensive guards
Chicago Bears players
Illinois sheriffs
Millikin Big Blue baseball players
Millikin Big Blue football players
Millikin Big Blue men's basketball players
Pro Football Hall of Fame inductees
People from Collinsville, Illinois
American people of Italian descent
Players of American football from Illinois
20th-century American politicians
American men's basketball players